David George Robisch (born December 22, 1949) is a retired American professional basketball player in the ABA and NBA.  Robisch played at the University of Kansas, where he was initiated into the Sigma Nu fraternity.  He was positioned at center and forward for the Denver Rockets / Nuggets (1971–75, 1980–83), Indiana Pacers (1975–77), San Diego Sails (1975), Los Angeles Lakers (1977–79), Cleveland Cavaliers (1979–80), San Antonio Spurs (1983) and Kansas City Kings (1984).

He helped the Nuggets win the 1974–75 ABA Western Division.

On October 8, 1975 Robisch was part of one of the more infamous trades in ABA history.  The Baltimore Claws, despite financial problems, had obtained the rights to star Dan Issel from the Kentucky Colonels.  The Claws were unable to come through with the $500,000 they owed the Colonels for Issel.  Under pressure from the league, the Claws traded Issel to the Denver Nuggets in exchange for Robisch and $500,000 (which was used to pay the Kentucky Colonels the money owed for Issel).

Achievements
Ranks 1st on ABA Career Turnover Ratio List (7.9).
Ranks 9th on ABA Career Blocks Per Game List (.7).
Ranks 15th on ABA Career Rebound Rate List (14.2).

In 13 seasons he played in 930 games and played 22,780 minutes, having a 46.4% field goal percentage (3,997 for 8,620), a 79.8% free throw percentage (2,587 for 3,241), 6,173 total rebounds (1,992 offensive, 4,181 defensive), 1,656 assists, 986 turnovers, 2,069 personal fouls and 10,581 points.

Robisch is currently an elected official in Springfield, Illinois, serving as a Trustee of Capital Township. His wife, Lou, is an administrator for Sangamon County, and their sons Scott and Brett both played college basketball.

Robisch is a 1967 graduate of Springfield High School.

In 2006, Robisch was voted as one of the 100 Legends of the IHSA Boys Basketball Tournament, a group of former players and coaches in honor of the 100 anniversary of the IHSA boys basketball tournament.

References

External links
Career statistics at basketball-reference.com

1949 births
Living people
All-American college men's basketball players
American men's basketball players
Basketball players from Cincinnati
Boston Celtics draft picks
Centers (basketball)
Cleveland Cavaliers players
Denver Nuggets players
Denver Rockets players
Illinois Republicans
Indiana Pacers players
Kansas City Kings players
Kansas Jayhawks men's basketball players
Los Angeles Lakers players
Power forwards (basketball)
San Antonio Spurs players
San Diego Sails players
Sportspeople from Springfield, Illinois